Bathyblennius antholops is a species of combtooth blenny found in the eastern Atlantic Ocean, around the Gulf of Guinea. It is the only member of its genus. It can reach a maximum length of  SL.

References

Salarinae

Fish described in 1970
Taxa named by Victor G. Springer
Taxa named by William Farr Smith-Vaniz